Connecticut's 34th House of Representatives district elects one member of the Connecticut House of Representatives. It consists of the towns of East Haddam, East Hampton, and parts of Colchester. It has been represented by Republican Irene Haines since 2019.

Recent elections

2020

2018

2016

2014

2012

References

34